François-Honorat de Beauvilliers, 1st duc de Saint-Aignan (30 October 160716 June 1687), born in Paris, was a French military leader, administrator and man of letters. He was peer of France and a member of the Académie française.

Biography
He was the son of Honorat de Beauvilliers, comte de Saint-Aignan (1579–1622) and of Jacqueline de La Grange d'Arquian.

After having been through the campaigns in Germany (1634–1635), Franche-Comté (1636), and Flanders (1637), was sent to the Bastille in consequence of his having lost the Battle of Thionville in 1640. In reward for his devotion to the court party during the Fronde, his county of Saint-Aignan was elevated to a dukedom in 1663, with the special privilege of the peerage (duché-pairie), making him one of the highest ranking aristocrats of the kingdom of France.

Beauvilliers was famous by his protection of writers and literary people, as well as by his military skills and services. He entered the Académie française in 1663.

The 1st duc de Saint-Aignan died in Paris in 1687. He was the father of the influential duc de Beauvilliers, as well as of Anne Marie de Bethune.

See also
Duke of Saint-Aignan

References

Beauvillier, Francois de
Beauvillier, Francois de
Members of the Académie Française
17th-century peers of France
Peers created by Louis XIV
Dukes of Saint-Aignan